Stephen Mowlam OAM (born 22 December 1976 in Victoria) is a field hockey goalkeeper from Australia, who was a member of the team that won the golden medal at the 2004 Summer Olympics in Athens by beating title holders The Netherlands in the final.

He made his debut earlier that year during the Sultan Azlan Shah Cup in Kuala Lumpur, in the match against South Korea on 10 January. Mowlam is nicknamed Gimpy.

External links
 
 Profile on Hockey Australia

1976 births
Australian male field hockey players
Male field hockey goalkeepers
Olympic field hockey players of Australia
Olympic gold medalists for Australia
Field hockey players at the 2004 Summer Olympics
2006 Men's Hockey World Cup players
Recipients of the Medal of the Order of Australia
Sportsmen from Victoria (Australia)
Living people
Commonwealth Games gold medallists for Australia
Field hockey players at the 2006 Commonwealth Games
Olympic medalists in field hockey
Medalists at the 2004 Summer Olympics
Commonwealth Games medallists in field hockey
Medallists at the 2006 Commonwealth Games